Te Arohanui  is the sixth studio album by New Zealand recording artist Stan Walker. It is Walker's first in te reo Māori and released on 17 September 2021 by Sony Music New Zealand and features features a combination of Walker's greatest hits re-recorded in te reo Māori and several new tracks. The album was announced on 31 August 2021 and is dedicated to his late grandmother.

In an interview with Newshub, Walker said now is "the perfect time" to release a Te Reo record, saying "It was always meant to be. It happened at a time where there's a shift within the people, within everybody who calls Aotearoa home. Music is the most powerful gift and tool that we have. I feel like our reo is like poetry and waiata. It's something that teaches, educates, heals, uplifts, breaks down and gives people permission to feel in ways that they couldn't feel. Our reo, equally, does the same thing for me. I think it's a powerful time to release reo Māori waiata."

The album title is in honour of his family matriarch, Te Arohanui McLeod (nee Nepia), affectionately known as "Nanny Taini".

Track listing

Charts

Weekly charts

Year-end charts

References

2021 albums
Stan Walker albums
Sony Music Australia albums
Māori-language albums